IFK Motala is a sports club in Motala, Sweden, founded in 1932 and practicing bandy and soccer. IFK Motala's bandy team currently plays in Elitserien, and home games are played at the Motala Isstadion. The club won the men's Swedish Bandy Championship in 1987.

History
IFK Motala was founded in 1932.

Honours

Domestic
 Swedish Champions:
 Winners (1): 1987
 Runners-up (1): 1985

References

External links
Official website
ibdb bandysidan

Bandy clubs in Sweden
Sport in Motala
Bandy clubs established in 1932
1932 establishments in Sweden
Idrottsföreningen Kamraterna